Cyia Batten (born January 26, 1972) is an American dancer, model, actress, and former Pussycat Dolls dance troupe member.

Career 
She has worked as a professional dancer all over the world for various projects including The Pussycat Dolls and Carmen Electra, Teatro Comunale di Firenze and others.

She has had roles in Charlie Wilson's War, The Texas Chainsaw Massacre: The Beginning, Sins of the Mind, Charlie's Angels: Full Throttle, The Sweetest Thing and Killer Movie and on such TV shows as CSI, CSI: NY, CSI: Miami and Crossing Jordan as well as numerous appearances as different characters on  Star Trek: Deep Space Nine, Star Trek: Voyager, Star Trek: Enterprise, and Studio 60 on the Sunset Strip.

Batten was awarded Best Actress at Screamfest LA 2005 for her role in Cookers in which she played a crystal meth addict. She replaced actress Kelly Carlson in the 2007 horror film Killer Movie.

Filmography

Film

Television

References

External links

 
 

1972 births
American female dancers
Dancers from New York (state)
American film actresses
American television actresses
Living people
People from Locust Valley, New York
20th-century American actresses
21st-century American actresses
Actresses from New York (state)